Gagoré (also spelled Gogné) is a town in southern Ivory Coast. It is a sub-prefecture of Lakota Department in Lôh-Djiboua Region, Gôh-Djiboua District.

Gagoré was a commune until March 2012, when it became one of 1126 communes nationwide that were abolished.

In 2014, the population of the sub-prefecture of Gagoré was 15,011.

Villages
The 5 villages of the sub-prefecture of Gagoré and their population in 2014 are:

 Brihiri (585)
 Digako (3 901)
 Gagoré (2 417)
 Kadéko (6 390)
 Zatoboua (1 718)

References

Sub-prefectures of Lôh-Djiboua
Former communes of Ivory Coast